A body cavity bomb (BCB) is an explosive device hidden inside the body of a person in order to commit a suicide attack. While this concept has been used many times in fiction, it is almost unknown in real life. A body cavity bomb is only known to have been used once, in a failed assassination attempt. 

A hypothetical further elaboration of the concept in the form of a surgically implanted explosive device has been the subject of speculation, but no such device has ever been found in real life.

2009 attack on Prince Muhammad bin Nayef 
In August 2009 Abdullah al-Asiri, the younger brother of Ibrahim al-Asiri (Al Qaeda in the Arabian Peninsula's chief bomb-maker), tried to assassinate a Saudi prince, Muhammad bin Nayef, with an improvised explosive device that had been inserted into his rectum and anal canal.

On 27 August 2009, Asiri queued up at Mohammed bin Nayef's palace in Jeddah as a "well-wisher," a tradition in the kingdom during Ramadan. He exploded the device (perhaps with a mobile phone), killing himself, but only lightly injuring bin Nayef (who was protected from the full force of the blast by Asiri's body). Assisted by his older brother, Ibrahim al-Asiri, he had hidden a pound (about 0.45kg) of PETN plastic explosives in his rectum and anal canal, which security experts described as a novel technique. Asiri had passed through a metal detector and remained in the security of the Prince's bodyguards for over 24 hours before gaining the audience. "I did not want him to be searched, but he surprised me by blowing himself up," said Mohammed bin Nayef. The Saudi Gazette reported on October 22, 2009, that a Yemeni named Rayed Abdullah Salem Al Harbi assisted Asiri in preparing for his suicide mission.

Media speculation 
In May 2012, various reporters leaked their acquisition of documents describing the preparation and use of such devices. According to The Daily Mirror in the UK, security officials at MI-6 asserted that female bombers could  travel undetected carrying the explosive chemicals in otherwise standard breast implants. The bomber would blow up the implanted explosives by injecting a chemical trigger.

Analysis 
Tactically speaking, the use and employment of the BCB falls into a category of tactics known as ‘in-situ’ attacks. The factors which could thwart the effective use of the BCB, are:
 By its very nature, as a weapon it is intended for closed-in attacks (the attacker carrying the device has to be in direct contact with the target);
 This is because the blast yield, has been shown to be low, to negligible.
 The attacker, to be successful, has to enact an ‘in situ’ attack, physically placing their body against the target, and initiating the device.
The other constraint is that this weapon likely decreases in effect if used outdoors, as indoors closed environments offer the best physical possible properties, where blast-reflection is a factor in confinement. Thus, as can be seen, the very factors that make the BCB effective are also highly limiting.

Detection 
Body cavity bombs are hard to detect by most non-invasive means. However, attempts have been made to create methods for detecting them using various physical principles, including nuclear quadrupole resonance.

In fiction 
The BCB has a long history in science fiction writing and film history. For example, in the 1957 novella "Run for the Stars" by Harlan Ellison, the drug-addicted protagonist has a bomb implanted in his abdomen to delay an advancing alien army, making him an involuntary suicide bomber. Notwithstanding, in conventional security thinking, it has been noted that "placing bombs inside live human beings was still definitely not on the radar" prior to 2009.

The concept of the BCB has been regularly used as a theatrical–plot device in many popular TV shows and movies since at least the late 1960s (and perhaps earlier), and a number of popular U.S. films and television series episodes have featured the BCB, "ironically illustrating many of the key tactical concepts herein—that is, it is hidden in the human body, camouflaged from intelligence sensors, and used for attacks on specific targets". For example:

 The U.S. film, Death Race 2000, a 1975 cult action film, in which one of the characters called ‘Frankenstein’ intends to assassinate the president by planning to shake his hand, detonating a grenade which has been implanted in the perpetrator's prosthetic right hand (who calls it his ‘hand grenade’).
 The 1990 Star Trek: The Next Generation episode ‘Reunion’ features an attempted assassination using a BCB hidden and undetected (from security sensors) inside a person's arm, requiring them to stand close to their intended target.
 The 2001 U.S. science fiction movie Impostor, based on the 1953 short story Impostor by Philip K. Dick, features the use of BCBs. Set in the year 2079, the film's plot revolves around human 'replicants', created by hostile aliens, which are perfect biological copies of existing humans, complete with transplanted memories. This allows the 'replicants' to approach their targets camouflaged from detection. Each has a small, organic nuclear bomb in place of a heart, programmed to detonate when they are in proximity to their target.
 The British television series Spooks features in its season 3 finale a woman carrying a chemical BCB in an attempt to murder the prime minister, the bomb contained in her stomach to avoid discovery.
 The 2008 Batman film, The Dark Knight, also featured a BCB. In that film, a fictional scenario was portrayed where the Joker blew up a police station by means of a cell-phone activated bomb sewn into an unwilling victim's stomach.
 The novel Eve of Destruction by Sylvia Day features several female protagonists who have been implanted with BCB devices.
The 2009 war film The Hurt Locker features a BCB when a young Iraqi boy is found to have been surgically implanted with an unexploded bomb.
The 2015 video game Metal Gear Solid V: Ground Zeroes features two BCB's inside Paz, implanted by Skull Face as a set-up. One bomb is successfully removed, but the other explodes, killing Paz,  destroying the helicopter that they were on and wounding Big Boss severely in the process.
 In season one of the 2015 Israeli television series, Fauda, an operative of the Israel Defense Forces is kidnapped by Hamas and killed with a BCB.

See also 
 Improvised explosive device

References 

Explosives
Improvised explosive devices
Terrorism by method